Penn State Fayette, The Eberly Campus is a commonwealth campus of the Pennsylvania State University and located in Lemont Furnace, Pennsylvania. The campus serves students from the southwestern corner of Pennsylvania covering a five-county area that includes all or parts of Fayette, Greene, Somerset, Washington, and Westmoreland counties. The campus also enrolls students from other states and maintains a small international student population. Students at Penn State Fayette can complete the first two years of most of majors available in the Penn State system along with the entirety of six bachelor's degrees and eight associate degree programs.

History
Penn State founded an education center in the area in 1934, as part of an initiative to provide localized learning facilities that could grant associate degrees or allow students to complete the first two years of a bachelor's degree without the expense of living in University Park. However, the center was closed in the 1940s due to World War II. In the 1950s, the commonwealth campus system was established and local branch campuses, each fully integrated into the Penn State system, were established across the state. Fayette Campus opened in 1965. It was first housed in rented space in downtown Uniontown before relocating to its current site three years later.

In 2004, the campus was named for Robert E. Eberly, a wealthy Pittsburgh natural gas speculator who endowed his fortune to Western Pennsylvania higher education.

Academics
Class sizes average between 20 and 25 students and the largest classes on campus are typically no larger than 60 to 75 students. Students at Penn State Fayette can complete the first two years of nearly all 160+ majors offered throughout the Penn State system.

Activities
The Office of Student Life provides a multitude of activities for students, including community service initiatives, novelty activities, leadership and educational opportunities, social events, and cultural programming. Students can also choose from more than 20 student-run clubs and organizations.

Athletics
Penn State Fayette teams participate as a member of the United States Collegiate Athletic Association (USCAA). The Roaring Lions are a member of the Pennsylvania State University Athletic Conference (PSUAC). Men's sports include baseball, basketball, cross country and wrestling while women's sports include basketball, cross country, softball and volleyball.

References

External links 

Official athletics website

Pennsylvania State University colleges
Educational institutions established in 1965
Universities and colleges in Fayette County, Pennsylvania
USCAA member institutions
1965 establishments in Pennsylvania
Fayette